Golf at the Island Games, the biennial multi-sports event for island nations, territories and dependencies, was first played in 1991 with the Ladies competitions starting in 1997. It has now become a regular sport in the Island Games.

Individual competitions
 Men – a maximum of 4 amateur competitors per Member Island 
 Ladies – a maximum of 4 amateur competitors per Member Island 
Team events
 Men – a maximum of 4 amateur competitors and a minimum of 3 amateur competitors per Member Island. 
 Ladies – a maximum of 4 amateur competitors and a minimum of 3 amateur competitors per Member Island

Minimum age – 13

Events

Top medalists

Men's individual

Men's team event

Women's individual

Women's team event

References

 
Sports at the Island Games
Island Games